Sari Bolagh (also Romanized as Sārī Bolāgh; also known as S̄ār Bolāgh) is a village in Hajjilu Rural District, in the Central District of Kabudarahang County, Hamadan Province, Iran. At the 2006 census, its population was 27, in 6 families.

References 

Populated places in Kabudarahang County